Lakarabad-e Olya (also Romanized as Lakarābād-e ‘Olyā; also known as Lakarābād-e Bālā) is a village in Angut-e Gharbi Rural District, Anguti District, Germi County, Ardabil Province, Iran. At the 2006 census, its population was 206, in 37 families.

References 

Tageo

Towns and villages in Germi County